Renewable natural gas (RNG), also known as sustainable natural gas (SNG) or biomethane, is a biogas which has been upgraded to a quality similar to fossil natural gas and having a methane concentration of 90% or greater. By increasing the concentration of methane to a similar level as natural gas, it becomes possible to distribute the gas to customers via the existing gas grid and use in existing appliances. Renewable natural gas is a subset of synthetic natural gas or substitute natural gas (SNG).

Multiple ways of methanising carbon dioxide/monoxide and hydrogen exist, including biomethanation, the Sabatier process and a new electrochemical process pioneered in the United States currently undergoing trials.

Advantages
Renewable natural gas can be produced and distributed via the existing gas grid, making it an attractive means of supplying existing premises with renewable heat and renewable gas energy, while requiring no extra capital outlay of the customer. The existing gas network also allows distribution of gas energy over vast distances at a minimal cost in energy. Existing networks would allow biogas to be sourced from remote markets that are rich in low-cost biomass (Russia or Scandinavia for example). Renewable natural gas can also be converted into liquefied natural gas (LNG) for direct use as fuel in transport sector.

The UK National Grid believes that at least 15% of all gas consumed could be made from matter such as sewage, food waste such as food thrown away by supermarkets and restaurants and organic waste created by businesses such as breweries. In the United States, analysis conducted in 2011 by the Gas Technology Institute determined that renewable gas from waste biomass including agricultural waste has the potential to add up to 2.5 quadrillion Btu annually, being enough to meet the natural gas needs of 50% of American homes. The Environmental and Energy Study Institute estimated that renewable natural gas could replace up to 10% of all natural gas used in the United States, and a study by the National Association of Clean Water Agencies and the Water Environment Federation found that the quantity of biosolids removed from wastewater could be turned into enough biogas to potentially meet up to 12% of America's national electricity demand.

In combination with power-to-gas, whereby the carbon dioxide and carbon monoxide fraction of biogas are converted to methane using electrolyzed hydrogen, the renewable gas potential of raw biogas is approximately doubled.

Production
A biomass to RNG efficiency of 70% can be achieved during the production process. Costs are minimised by maximising production scale and by locating an anaerobic digestion plant next to transport links (e.g. a port or river) for the chosen source of biomass. The existing gas storage infrastructure would allow the plant to continue to manufacture gas at the full utilisation rate even during periods of weak demand, helping minimise manufacturing capital costs per unit of gas produced.

Renewable gas can be produced through three main processes:
 Anaerobic digestion of organic material. This can be done in dedicated anaerobic digesters or as a byproduct gas collected from landfills and wastewater treatment.
 Production through the Sabatier reaction. With the Sabatier reaction, the gas from primary production has to be upgraded with a secondary step in order to produce gas that is suitable for injection into the gas grid.
 Thermal gasification of organic (normally dry) material

Commercial development

BioSNG from wood
Göteborg Energi opened the first demonstration plant for large scale production of bio-SNG through gasification of forest residues in Gothenburg, Sweden within the GoBiGas project. The plant had the capacity to produce 20 megawatts-worth of bioSNG from about 30 MW-worth of biomass, aiming at a conversion efficiency of 65%. From December 2014 the bioSNG plant was fully operational and supplied gas to the Swedish natural gas grid, reaching the quality demands with a methane content of over 95%. The plant was permanently closed due to economic problems in April 2018. Göteborg Energi had invested 175 million euro in the plant and intensive attempts for a year to sell the plant to new investors had failed.

It can be noted that the plant was a technical success, and performed as intended. However, it was not economically viable, given the prices of natural gas at the time. It is expected the plant is to re-emerge around 2030 when economic conditions may be more favourable, with the possibility of a higher carbon price.

SNG is of particular interest in countries with extensive natural gas distribution networks. Core advantages of SNG include compatibility with existing natural gas infrastructure, higher efficiency that Fisher-Tropsch fuels production and smaller-production scale than other second generation biofuel production systems. The Energy Research Centre of the Netherlands has conducted extensive research on large-scale SNG production from woody biomass, based on the importation of feedstocks from abroad.

Renewable natural gas plants based on wood can be categorised into two main categories, one being allothermal, which has the energy provided by a source outside of the gasifier. One example is the double-chambered fluidised bed gasifiers consisting of a separate combustion and gasification chambers. Autothermal systems generate the heat within the gasifier, but require the use of pure oxygen to avoid nitrogen dilution.

In the UK, NNFCC found that any UK bioSNG plant built by 2020 would be highly likely to use "clean woody feedstocks" and that there are several regions with good availability of that source.

RNG development by country
In the UK, using anaerobic digestion is growing as a means of producing renewable biogas, with nearly 90 biomethane injection sites built across the country. Ecotricity announced plans to supply green gas to UK consumers via the national grid. Centrica also announced that it would begin injecting gas, manufactured from sewage, into the gas grid.

In Canada, FortisBC, a gas provider in British Columbia, injects renewably created natural gas into its existing gas distribution system.

A company called Divert, which also reduces food waste through donation, says it will use a $1 billion investment from Canadian pipeline operator Enbridge to scaling its existing network of food waste anaerobic digestors to cover all major markets of North America.

Sustainable synthetic natural gas
Sustainable SNG is produced by high temperature oxygen blown slagging co-gasification at 70 to 75 bar pressure of biomass or waste residue. The advantage of a wide range of feedstocks is that much larger quantities of renewable SNG can be produced compared with biogas, with fewer supply chain limitations. A wide range of fuels with an overall biogenic carbon content of 50 to 55% is technically and financially viable. Hydrogen is added to the fuel mix during the gasification process, and carbon dioxide is removed by capture from the purge gas "slip stream" syngas clean-up and catalytic methanation stages.

Large scale sustainable SNG will enable the UK gas and electricity grids to be substantially de-carbonised in parallel at source, while maintaining the existing operational and economic relationship between the gas and electricity grids. Carbon capture and sequestration can be added at little additional cost, thereby progressively achieving deeper de-carbonisation of the existing gas and electricity grids at low cost and operational risk. Cost benefit studies indicate that large scale 50% biogenic carbon content sustainable SNG can be injected into the high pressure gas transmission grid at a cost of around 65p/therm. At this cost, it is possible to re-process fossil natural gas, used as an energy input into the gasification process, into 5 to 10 times greater quantity of sustainable SNG. Large scale sustainable SNG, combined with continuing natural gas production from UK continental shelf and unconventional gas, will potentially enable the cost of UK peak electricity to be de-coupled from international oil denominated 'take or pay' gas supply contracts.

Applications:
 Electricity generation
 Space heating
 Process heating
 Biomass with carbon capture and storage
 Transportation fuel

Environmental concerns
Biogas creates similar environmental pollutants as ordinary natural gas fuel, such as carbon monoxide, sulfur dioxide, nitrogen oxide, hydrogen sulfide and particulates. Any unburned gas that escapes contains methane, a long lived greenhouse gas. The key difference from fossil natural gas is that it is often considered partly or fully carbon neutral, since the carbon dioxide contained in the biomass is naturally renewed in each generation of plants, rather than being released from fossil stores and increasing atmospheric carbon dioxide.

A major concern is that the potential biogas yield would only represent a small percentage of existing supplies of fossil gas (also called natural gas). This fact has led existing natural gas suppliers to push back against measures to increase the use of electricity as an energy supply - decreasing demand for gas.  This reality prompted Southern California Gas Company (SoCalGas) to covertly support the creation of a nonprofit: Californians for Balanced Energy Solutions (C4Bes) which then went on to lobby for the gas sector and against the momentum in favor of electrification. The Sierra Club exposed the hand of SoCalGas in the formation of C4Bes (astroturfing) and so C4Bes curtailed its lobbying activities, although it continued to promote demand for gas.

See also

 Anaerobic digestion
 Biofuel
 Biogas
 Carbon-neutral fuel
 Issues relating to biofuels
 Landfill gas utilization
 Power-to-gas
 Renewable energy
 Sustainable energy

References

External links
 "Renewable carbon neutral methane to be produced in south-west Queensland" ARENA accessed 6 December 2020
 National Grid U.S. – Vision for a Sustainable Gas Network 
 American Gas Foundation Study: The Potential for Renewable Gas 
 SGC Rapport 187 Substitute natural gas from biomass gasification
 SGC Rapport on gasification and methanation
 http://www.eee-info.net/cms/netautor/napro4/wrapper/media.php?
 Production of Synthetic Natural Gas (SNG) from Biomass- From Energy Research Centre of the Netherlands
 ECN SNG Website 
 SNG Platform in Güssing
 National Grid/UK Sustainable Gas Group
  Production of Biogas from organic waste Bioenergy

Bioenergy
Biofuels
Biogas technology
Natural gas
Renewable energy